Daniel Geoffrey Craig Johnson (born 3 April 1988) is an Australian professional basketball player for the Adelaide 36ers of the National Basketball League (NBL). Standing 6'11½" (212 cm) tall, Johnson's primary position is centre, but with a strong mid and long range shooting ability, he is equally effective at playing power forward. He is a seven-time All-NBL Team member, including three All-NBL First Team recognitions. Johnson is also a long-time Australian state league player and has had many stints overseas.

Early life and junior career
Johnson was born in Carnarvon, Western Australia, and grew up in Perth, where he attended Willetton Senior High School. In 2006 and 2007, he attended the Australian Institute of Sport (AIS) and played for the program's SEABL team. In 2006, he helped the AIS win the King Club International Cup en route to being voted the tournament's Most Valuable Player after averaging 22 points, six rebounds, one assist, two blocks and a steal over five games. He was also a member of the Australian national under-19 team that competed in Germany, Taiwan and Italy in 2006. The following year, he played for the Emus at the 2007 FIBA Under-19 World Championship in Serbia.

Johnson moved to the United States to play college basketball for Pepperdine University in the 2007–08 NCAA season. Holding the Waves' starting centre position for most of the season, Johnson averaged 9.4 points and 3.8 rebounds in 21 games.

Professional career

NBL
Johnson returned to Australia in 2008 and played two seasons with the Melbourne Tigers in the NBL. In his rookie season, the Tigers made it to the grand final series, where they lost in five games to the South Dragons.

Johnson played his first season with the Adelaide 36ers in 2010–11. In his second season with Adelaide, Johnson earned his first player of the week award and won the NBL Most Improved Player while also earning All-NBL Third Team honours. In his third season with Adelaide, he led the league in rebounding (8.1 per game) and earned All-NBL Second Team honours.

In the 2013–14 season, Johnson helped the 36ers reach the NBL Grand Final series while earning All-NBL First Team honors. He was also named the 36ers Club MVP for the third straight year.

Johnson started the 2014–15 season in Poland with Stelmet Zielona Góra, but returned to the Adelaide 36ers in January 2015.

In the 2015–16 season, Johnson's 9.3 rebounds per game saw him lead the NBL in rebounding for the second time while once again earning All-NBL Second Team honours. In the 2016–17 season, Johnson helped the 36ers win the minor premiership while earning All-NBL First Team honours. In the 2017–18 season, Johnson helped the 36ers reach the NBL Grand Final series while earning All-NBL First Team honours. In the 2018–19 season, Johnson served as captain of the 36ers for the first time. He went on to win the Club MVP and earn All-NBL Second Team honours.

In October 2019, Johnson played his 250th game for the 36ers as well as his 300th in the NBL. He scored an NBL career-high 38 points in a loss to the Cairns Taipans on 18 January 2020. He went on to win the Club MVP for the fifth time.

In May 2020, Johnson's contract with the 36ers was extended until the end of the 2022–23 season. He was named co-captain for the 2020–21 season. He played his 300th game for the 36ers and 350th NBL game during the season. He averaged a career-high 19.5 points per game in 2020–21 to lead the 36ers in scoring for the sixth time. He was subsequently named Club MVP alongside Josh Giddey.

In December 2022, Johnson played his 400th NBL game.

Off-season stints
Johnson is a long-time Australian state league player, having played for the Melbourne Tigers (Big V, 2008–09); Willetton Tigers (SBL, 2010); South Adelaide Panthers (Premier League, 2011), West Adelaide Bearcats (Premier League, 2013–14); Sturt Sabres (Premier League, 2016); and Forestville Eagles (Premier League / NBL1 Central, 2018 and 2022).

Additionally, Johnson has had a number of off-season stints overseas, with his first stint abroad coming following the 2013–14 NBL season when he played in Puerto Rico for Piratas de Quebradillas. He went on to play in New Zealand for the Wellington Saints in 2015, before returning to Puerto Rico in 2016 to play for Santeros de Aguada. In 2017, he played for Petrochimi Bandar Imam in Iran; in 2018, he played for Ferro Carril Oeste in Argentina; and in 2019, he played for Earth Friends Tokyo Z in Japan. He returned to Japan in March 2020 for a one-game stint with SeaHorses Mikawa.

National team career
In 2019, Johnson made his debut for the Australian Boomers playing in the FIBA Basketball World Cup qualifiers.

In 2022, Johnson helped the Australian men's 3x3 team win gold again at the FIBA 3x3 Asia Cup in Singapore. He represented Australia in 3x3 at the 2022 Commonwealth Games in England, where the team won silver.

References

External links
Adelaide 36ers player profile
Take 40: Daniel Johnson
NBL stats

1988 births
Living people
Adelaide 36ers players
Australian men's basketball players
Australian expatriate basketball people in Argentina
Australian expatriate basketball people in Japan
Australian expatriate basketball people in Iran
Australian expatriate basketball people in New Zealand
Australian expatriate basketball people in Poland
Australian expatriate basketball people in Puerto Rico
Australian expatriate basketball people in the United States
Basket Zielona Góra players
Centers (basketball)
Earth Friends Tokyo Z players
Ferro Carril Oeste basketball players
Melbourne Tigers players
Pepperdine Waves men's basketball players
Petrochimi Bandar Imam BC players
Piratas de Quebradillas players
Power forwards (basketball)
Santeros de Aguada basketball players
SeaHorses Mikawa players
Basketball players from Perth, Western Australia
Wellington Saints players